The 2010 Kizlyar bombings were double suicide attacks that occurred on March 31, 2010 in Kizlyar, in Russia's North Caucasus republic of Dagestan. 12 people were killed and another 18 injured.

References 

21st-century mass murder in Russia
Attacks in Russia in 2010
Mass murder in 2010
Insurgency in the North Caucasus
Islamic terrorism in Russia
Suicide bombings in Russia
Terrorist incidents in Russia in 2010
March 2010 events in Russia